John Peel Session is an EP by the Finnish band Deep Turtle. The songs were recorded live at the Maida Vale Studios, London on 9 October 1994 for John Peel's Radio 1 show, broadcast on 11 October 1994. Deep Turtle was the first Finnish band invited on the show. The session was later released on a 7" single and CD by the indie label Bad Vugum.

Track listing
Side A
 "Toothpaste Tastebred" – 0:37
 "Tungo" – 2:51
 "Hedless" – 1:15
Side B
 "Nohand" – 1:28
 "Ratua" – 1:49
 "Gnülf" – 1:20

Personnel
Pentti Dassum – vocals, guitar
Tapio Laxström – bass guitar
Mikko Erjossaari – drums

References

1995 EPs
Deep Turtle
Live EPs
1995 live albums
Deep Turtle albums
Hardcore punk EPs
EPs by Finnish artists